Matthew John Ridge (born 27 August 1968) is a New Zealand television presenter, and a former rugby union and rugby league footballer.

A fullback in both codes, Ridge played rugby union for Auckland and became an All Black, but never won an international cap. He turned professional in 1990 with the Manly-Warringah Sea Eagles of the New South Wales Rugby League, and won the 1996 ARL Premiership. He later captained the Auckland Warriors and New Zealand national team (the Kiwis). An accurate goal-kicker, he set several scoring records in rugby league.

He is now best known for his work in television alongside his partner Marc Ellis in shows including Game of Two Halves and Marc & Matthew's Rocky Road to….

Rugby union career

Ridge was educated at Mount Albert Grammar School and Auckland Grammar School. He was selected for Auckland age-group teams and played for New Zealand Secondary Schools in 1986.

In 1988, while still aged 18, he made his first-class debut for the New Zealand Colts and played one match for Auckland. In the 1989 season, Ridge made rapid progress with Ponsonby and as part of the dominant Auckland team of that time.

Ridge was selected for the All Blacks' British tour in 1989. He played six games on the undefeated tour, but could not displace John Gallagher from the test team. Seeing his path to playing international rugby blocked by Gallagher, Ridge decided to move to rugby league in 1990 without ever winning a New Zealand cap. Only days later, Gallagher announced that he too was switching codes, signing for Leeds Rhinos.

Rugby league career
Despite never having played a game of rugby league in his life, Ridge was signed by the Manly-Warringah Sea Eagles and their Kiwi coach Graham Lowe to play in the New South Wales Rugby League's Winfield Cup competition from 1990. Ridge made his debut at fullback for the Sea Eagles in their Round 10 clash with Cronulla at Manly's home ground, Brookvale Oval. He became the team's first choice goal kicker ahead of captain and dual rugby international Michael O'Connor and part-time kicker Mal Cochrane when he kicked 6/7 in his first game helping 10th placed Manly to a 28–8 win over the 3rd placed Sharks. Ridge ended the 1990 season as Manly's leading scorer with 94 points (2 tries, 43/57 goals) in 11 games.

Just six games into his rugby league career, Ridge played his first test for New Zealand against the touring Great Britain Lions. On 8 July 1990 at the Mount Smart Stadium in Auckland, Ridge kicked 5 goals as the Kiwis went down 16–14 in front of 7,843 fans. He backed this up a week later with another six-goal performance in helping New Zealand to a 21–18 win over the Lions at Queen Elizabeth II Park in Christchurch.

Despite good form for Manly in 1991, Ridge missed selection for the mid-season Trans-Tasman Test series against Australia due to a dispute over compensation between clubs and the New Zealand Rugby League (NZRL) which also ruled out Daryl Halligan, John Schuster and Kurt Sherlock.

Ridge's 'defection' from rugby union to rugby league was the subject of a TV documentary, In a Different League. It was hosted and narrated by his friend and former teammate John Kirwan who himself switched to league with the Auckland Warriors in 1995. The documentary, broadcast in 1991, showed Ridge's early days with Manly and his introduction to test football with the New Zealand team, as well as the reaction when John Gallagher also switched to league a week after Ridge.

After an injury-interrupted 1992 season when Ridge regained his place as the Kiwis' fullback for the two tests against the touring Great Britain team, the 1993 season started solidly. However, he was side-lined for the rest of the year after suffering a knee injury. The injury saw him miss selection for the mid-season Trans-Tasman series against as well as the end of year Kiwi tour of Great Britain and France.

Ridge returned to form in 1994, playing 23 games for Manly and scoring 234 points (5 tries, 106/132 goals) for the season. He also regained the Kiwi #1 jumper when he was selected for the two tests against Papua New Guinea in October.

Ridge played and kicked goals in each of the 1995 Trans-Tasman Test series' three games against Australia, though the Kiwis lost the series 0–3 (he kicked 7/8 during the series, only missing his first kick in the 3rd test). Ridge was knocked out attempting to tackle Australian winger Rod Wishart in the first half of the final test at Suncorp Stadium in Brisbane, won 46–10 by Australia.

Ridge finished the 1995 ARL season as the league's top point-scorer with a club record 257 points (11 tries, 106 goals and 1 field goal), breaking Graham Eadie's record of 242 points. At the end of the season he played for the Sea Eagles at fullback in their 4–17 Grand final loss against the Sydney Bulldogs. Ridge captained the New Zealand team at the 1995 Rugby League World Cup in England and Wales. The Kiwis finished in third place, losing a hard-fought semi-final 20–30 to Australia after extra-time in Huddersfield.

In 1996, Ridge a prominent supporter of Super League in the dispute which split the sport, sat out nine weeks of the season when the new competition was put on hold. However, Manly won the ARL Grand Final, defeating the Dragons, with Ridge playing a major part. In 1997, Ridge moved to the Auckland Warriors who had switched to the Super League during the Super League war.

In total, Ridge scored 1,093 points in 122 first grade games for Manly between 1990 and 1996 (32 tries, 477/599 goals @ 79.63%, 11 Fg ), putting him then third on the all-time Sea Eagles point scorers list behind fullbacks Bob Batty and Graham Eadie. Ridge's total currently sees him in fourth place. Along the way, he set the Sea Eagles' records for single season scoring (257 points in 1995 from 11 tries, 106 goals and 1 field goal), and points in a match - 30 points (2 tries, 11 goals) against Western Suburbs in 1996.

Ridge spent the 1997 Super League season as captain of the Warriors, though injuries kept him to just 9 games. He also captained New Zealand in a Super League test match against Australia in 1997.

In 1998 he wrote an autobiography with Angus Gillies, Take No Prisoners, published by Hodder Moa Beckett. He continued as captain of the Warriors in the 1998 NRL season and the first half of the Warriors' 1999 season. However, in the 1999 season he was sent off and suspended three times, missing twelve weeks, and he retired after the season.

In total he scored 238 points in 37 first grade games for the New Zealand Warriors between 1997 and his retirement in 1999 (8 tries, 103 goals). At the time of his retirement he was the all-time top scorer in international matches for the New Zealand national rugby league team with 168 points (6 tries, 71 goals) from 25 test appearances. He finished his rugby league club career with 1,331 total points (40 tries, 582/723 goals @ 80.22%, 11 field goals) from 159 games (Manly 122, Auckland 37), an average of 8.37 points per club game.

Post-playing career
In 2002, Matthew Ridge was chosen to host the original New Zealand version of television game show The Chair which first broadcast on ABC in January 2002 in the United States hosted by former tennis champion John McEnroe.

Ridge later became a television presenter, working with his partner Marc Ellis in various sports-related shows like 'Game of Two Halves', and 'Marc & Matthew's Rocky Road to ...'. In 2021 he presented a TV series Designing Dreams on six New Zealand architects: Roger Walker, Pip Cheshire, Julie Stout, Nicholas Dalton, Anna Maria Chin and Michael O'Sullivan.

Ridge became a board member of the Warriors (by then renamed the New Zealand Warriors) in 2009, when his friend Eric Watson bought the club. 

He was involved in a car accident in 2009, fracturing his pelvis and hip.

Personal life
Ridge and his first wife Sally Ridge, an interior designer and television presenter for TVNZ's Homefront. In November 2010, Ridge and his then-partner Carly Binding had a son, London Luca Ridge, and in December 2017, Ridge and his wife Chloe Alexa Liggins also had a son, Kenzo Axel Ridge.

See also
 List of New Zealand television personalities

References

External links 

 https://web.archive.org/web/20070212171518/http://www.sportingcontacts.co.nz/profile.asp?pid=34
Matthew Ridge at rugbymuseum.co.nz

1968 births
Living people
Dual-code rugby internationals
Manly Warringah Sea Eagles captains
Manly Warringah Sea Eagles players
New Zealand international rugby union players
New Zealand national rugby league team captains
New Zealand national rugby league team players
New Zealand people of Armenian descent
New Zealand rugby league players
New Zealand rugby union players
New Zealand television presenters
New Zealand Warriors captains
New Zealand Warriors players
People educated at Auckland Grammar School
People educated at Mount Albert Grammar School
Rugby league fullbacks
Rugby league players from Rotorua
Rugby union players from Rotorua